Lists of women artists cover women involved in the visual arts. The lists are organized by country, by work and by other attributes.

By country

List of Algerian women artists
List of American women artists
List of Argentine women artists
List of Armenian women artists
List of Australian women artists
List of Austrian women artists
List of Belgian women artists
List of Bosnia and Herzegovina women artists
List of Brazilian women artists
List of Canadian women artists
List of Chilean women artists
List of Chinese women artists
List of Colombian women artists
List of Croatian women artists
List of Cuban women artists
List of Czech women artists
List of Danish women artists
List of Dutch women artists
List of Dutch women photographers
List of Egyptian women artists
List of English women artists
List of Estonian women artists
List of Filipino women artists
List of Finnish women artists
List of French women artists
List of German women artists
List of Hungarian women artists
List of Icelandic women artists
List of Indian women artists
List of Iranian women artists
List of Iraqi women artists
List of Irish women artists
List of Israeli women artists
List of Italian women artists
List of Jamaican women artists
List of Japanese women artists
List of Latvian women artists
List of Lithuanian women artists
List of Macedonian women artists
List of Mexican women artists
List of Moroccan women artists
List of Norwegian women artists
List of Pakistani women artists
List of Polish women artists
List of Portuguese women artists
List of Romanian women artists
List of Russian women artists
List of Scottish women artists
List of Serbian women artists
List of Slovak women artists
List of Slovenian women artists
List of South African women artists
List of South Korean women artists
List of Spanish women artists
List of Swedish women artists
List of Swiss women artists
List of Trinidad and Tobago women artists
List of Turkish women artists
List of Ukrainian women artists
List of Venezuelan women artists
List of Welsh women artists

By medium
List of female comics creators
List of female film and television directors
List of female sculptors
List of women photographers
List of women botanical illustrators

By style 

 List of women Impressionists
Women surrealists

By exhibition 

 List of women artists in the Armory Show
 List of women artists exhibited at the 1893 World's Columbian Exposition
 Women Artists: 1550-1950

By book 

 English Female Artists
Great Women Masters of Art
 Women Painters of the World

By time period
List of 20th-century women artists
List of 21st-century women artists

Other 

 List of Native American women artists

See also
List of feminist artists
Ad Hoc Committee of Women Artists
Advancing Women Artists Foundation
Dictionary of Women Artists
Feminist art criticism
Incheon Women Artists' Biennale
National Association of Women Artists
Society of Women Artists
The Story of Women and Art
Women Artists News
Women Artists Visibility Event
Women Environmental Artists Directory
Women in the art history field
Women Painting Women
!Women Art Revolution
List of women in the Heritage Floor
Clara database